Fairplain is an unincorporated community in Jackson County, West Virginia, United States.

The community was so named on account of the "fair plains" near the original town site.

References

Unincorporated communities in Jackson County, West Virginia
Unincorporated communities in West Virginia